Mi querida herencia is a Mexican comedy television series produced by Elías Solorio for Televisa that premiered on Las Estrellas on 29 August 2019. The series stars Paul Stanley and Roxana Castellanos.

The series has been renewed for a third season, that premiered on April 15, 2021.

Plot 
Carlos Fernández de León is a partying and irresponsible man who lives off his father's money. When he dies, his father decides to leave his fortune to Carlos, with one condition: he must get married. Otherwise, the inheritance would go to the hands of his cousin Diego, an ambitious man, capable of everything for money. Carlos fulfills the condition imposed on him by his father and marries Deyanira, a waitress with a brother and sister and severe economic problems. Carlos never imagined that the will would have a clause stipulating that his marriage should last a minimum of 5 years.

In the second season, Carlos and Deyanira continue to pretend that they love each other and maintain a solid relationship. Diego now seeks to divorce them and keep the money, next to his faithful and innocent squire, Matías. Pamela, Carlos's ex-girlfriend, after finding out about this marriage, will seek to separate them, as she does not overcome that Carlos has chosen Deyanira and not her as his wife.

Cast 
 Paul Stanley as Carlos Fernández de León "Charly"
 Roxana Castellanos as Deyanira Rubí
 Bárbara Islas as Britny
 Luz Aldán as Jeny (season 1)
 Luis Orozco as Matías
 Agustín Arana as Diego Ruíz
 Mauricio Mancera as Javier
 Macaria as Pilar
 Ceci Flores as Dayana
 Alexander Tavizón as Max
 Patricio Castillo as Gregorio
 Eva Cedeño as Pamela (season 2)
 Édgar Vivar as Notario (guest, season 1; main, season 2)
 Natalia Madera as Escarlet (guest, season 2; main, season 3)

Episodes

Series overview

Season 1 (2019)

Season 2 (2020)

Season 3 (2021)

References

External links 
 

2019 Mexican television series debuts
Las Estrellas original programming
Mexican television sitcoms
Television series by Televisa
Spanish-language television shows